Amurrio Club is a Spanish football team based in Amurrio, in the autonomous community of Basque Country. Founded in 1949, it currently plays in Tercera División RFEF – Group 4, holding home games at Estadio Basarte, with a 4,000-seater capacity.

It is a partner club of the local professional team Deportivo Alavés.

Season to season

12 seasons in Segunda División B
12 seasons in Tercera División
1 season in Tercera División RFEF

Honours
RFEF Basque tournament (4): 1993–94, 2000–01, 2003–04, 2006–07

References

External links
Official website 
Futbolme team profile 

Football clubs in the Basque Country (autonomous community)
Association football clubs established in 1949
Divisiones Regionales de Fútbol clubs
1949 establishments in Spain